Stochastic quantum mechanics (or the stochastic interpretation) is an interpretation of quantum mechanics.

The modern application of stochastics to quantum mechanics involves the assumption of spacetime stochasticity, the idea that the small-scale structure of spacetime is undergoing both metric and topological fluctuations (John Archibald Wheeler's "quantum foam"), and that the averaged result of these fluctuations recreates a more conventional-looking metric at larger scales that can be described using classical physics, along with an element of nonlocality that can be described using quantum mechanics. A stochastic interpretation of quantum mechanics is due to persistent vacuum fluctuation. The main idea is that vacuum or spacetime fluctuations are the reason for quantum mechanics and not a result of it as it is usually considered.

Stochastic mechanics
The first relatively coherent stochastic theory of quantum mechanics was put forward by Hungarian physicist Imre Fényes who was able to show the Schrödinger equation could be understood as a kind of diffusion equation for a Markov process.

Louis de Broglie felt compelled to incorporate a stochastic process underlying quantum mechanics to make particles switch from one pilot wave to another. Perhaps the most widely known theory where quantum mechanics is assumed to describe an inherently stochastic process was put forward by Edward Nelson and is called stochastic mechanics. This was also developed by Davidson, Guerra, Ruggiero and others.

Stochastic electrodynamics

Stochastic quantum mechanics can be applied to the field of electrodynamics and is called stochastic electrodynamics (SED). SED differs profoundly from quantum electrodynamics (QED) but is nevertheless able to account for some vacuum-electrodynamical effects within a fully classical framework. In classical electrodynamics it is assumed there are no fields in the absence of any sources, while SED assumes that there is always a constantly fluctuating classical field due to zero-point energy. As long as the field satisfies the Maxwell equations there is no a priori inconsistency with this assumption. Since Trevor W. Marshall originally proposed the idea it has been of considerable interest to a small but active group of researchers.

See also

Bell's theorem
De Broglie–Bohm theory
EPR paradox
Hidden variable theory
Interpretations of quantum mechanics
Stochastic quantization

References

Notes

Papers

Books

 
 
 
 

Interpretations of quantum mechanics